The Canada-class ships of the line were a series of four 74-gun third rates designed for the Royal Navy by William Bateley. The name ship of the class was launched in 1765.

Design
During this period in British naval architecture, the 74-gun third rates were divided into two distinct groupings: the 'large' and 'common' classes. The Canada-class ships belonged to the latter grouping, carrying 18-pounder guns on their upper gun decks, as opposed to the 24-pounders of the large class.

Service
, made famous for Nelson's actions at the Battle of Cape St Vincent, belonged to this class of ships.

Ships

Builder: Woolwich Dockyard
Ordered: 1 December 1759
Launched: 17 September 1765
Fate: Broken up, 1834

Builder: Adams & Barnard, Deptford
Ordered: 23 August 1781
Launched: 11 December 1785
Fate: Broken up, 1816

Builder: Barnard, Deptford
Ordered: 2 October 1782
Launched: 1 June 1787
Fate: Broken up, 1814

Builder: Batson, Limehouse
Ordered: 14 November 1782
Launched: 26 January 1787
Fate: Burned and broken up, 1813

References

Lavery, Brian (2003) The Ship of the Line - Volume 1: The development of the battlefleet 1650–1850. Conway Maritime Press. .

 
Ship of the line classes